The Higurashi: When They Cry visual novel series is originally produced by the Japanese dōjin soft maker 07th Expansion, but features games produced in collaboration with Alchemist and Twilight Frontier. The games take place in the fictional Japanese town of Hinamizawa, and the stories revolve around a group of young friends and the strange events that occur in the village. The games have been released for Microsoft Windows PCs, the PlayStation 2, and the Nintendo DS handheld console. Higurashi no Naku Koro ni is a series of murder mystery visual novels that requires relatively little player interaction as most of the gameplay is composed of reading text which signifies either dialogue between characters or the inner thoughts of the protagonist who the player assumes. The games utilize intermissions where the player can obtain several TIPS which allow the player to read various supplementary information that may or may not be useful in solving the mystery.

The series debuted in Japan on August 10, 2002 with Onikakushi-hen, the first in a series of eight original games divided into the "question arcs" consisting of the first four games, and the "answer arcs" consisting of the latter four. The answer arcs shared the common title Higurashi no Naku Koro ni Kai. An additional fandisc known as Higurashi no Naku Koro ni Rei followed, and was the final game in the series produced by 07th Expansion. The eight original PC games were released in English by MangaGamer with the first four games released in December 2009. The last four games, however, were released individually starting with Meakashi-hen in February 2010. Alchemist has released six more games based on the original series, two for the PlayStation 2 and four for the Nintendo DS. Twilight Frontier produced a dōjin game 3D versus third-person shooter game entitled Higurashi Daybreak which was later ported to the PlayStation Portable by Cavia and Alchemist.

Main releases

Higurashi no Naku Koro ni

Higurashi no Naku Koro ni Kai

Higurashi no Naku Koro ni Rei

Expanded releases

Higurashi no Naku Koro ni Matsuri

Higurashi no Naku Koro ni Kizuna

Higurashi no Naku Koro ni Hō

Higurashi no Naku Koro ni Sui

Other series

Higurashi Daybreak

References

External links
Higurashi no Naku Koro ni  at 07th Expansion 
Higurashi Daybreak at Twilight Frontier 

Titles
Higurashi When They Cry